Semen Padang Football Club is an Indonesian professional football club, based in Indarung, Padang, West Sumatra. They currently compete in Liga 2.

Stadium

Semen Padang homebase is Haji Agus Salim Stadium.

Sponsors
Source:

 PT Semen Padang
 Xten Indonesia
 Le Minerale
 NG Corp

Honours

AFC (Asian competitions) 
Asian Cup Winners' Cup
 1993–94 – Quarter-finals
AFC Cup
 2013 –  Quarter-finals

Season-by-season records

Key
 Tms. = Number of teams
 Pos. = Position in league

Performance in AFC competitions

Players

Current squad

Naturalized player

Coaching Staff

References

External links

 Official Site of Semen Padang FC
  Club Details (Indonesian Premier League)
 Spartacks (Supporter of Semen Padang FC)
 The Kmers (Supporter of Semen Padang FC)

 
Association football clubs established in 1980
Football clubs in West Sumatra
Sport in West Sumatra
Football clubs in Indonesia
1980 establishments in Indonesia